The 1999 Nigerian Senate election in Kwara State was held on February 20, 1999, to elect members of the Nigerian Senate to represent Kwara State. Suleiman Ajadi representing Kwara South and Salman Is'haq representing Kwara Central won on the platform of All Nigeria Peoples Party, while Ahmed Zuruq representing Kwara North won on the platform of the Peoples Democratic Party.

Overview

Summary

Results

Kwara South 
The election was won by Suleiman Ajadi of the All Nigeria Peoples Party.

Kwara Central 
The election was won by Salman Is'haq of the All Nigeria Peoples Party.

Kwara North 
The election was won by Ahmed Zuruq of the Peoples Democratic Party.

References 

Kwa
Kwa
Kwara State Senate elections